Frederick Gustavus Scheibler Jr. (May 12, 1872 – June 15, 1958) was an American architect.

He was born in Pittsburgh, Pennsylvania, to William Augustus and Eleanor Amelia (Seidel) Scheibler. Although his father's name was William, Frederick was a junior because he was named for his uncle Frederick. His paternal grandparents had emigrated from Düsseldorf, Germany. He attended local public schools, but dropped out at age 16 to become an apprentice architect. From 1888 to 1898 he trained in the Pittsburgh firms of Henry Moser, V. Wyse Thalman, and Longfellow, Alden & Harlow.

Scheibler's body of architectural work, nearly 150 commissions over five decades, was in early 20th century Pittsburgh's neighborhoods and suburbs. He is best known for having taken inspiration from international progressive movements like Art Nouveau, the Viennese Secession, and the Arts and Crafts Movement.

Notable commissions
In chronological order:
 Kitzmiller House (1901), 2526 South Braddock Avenue, Swissvale, Pennsylvania
 Old Heidelberg Apartments (1905), 401-423 South Braddock Avenue, Point Breeze, Pittsburgh
 Miller House (1905), 7506 Trevanion Avenue, Regent Square, Swissvale, Pennsylvania
 Linwood Apartments (1906), 6801 McPherson Boulevard, North Point Breeze, Pittsburgh
 Row houses (1907), 7800 Inglenook Place, Wilkinsburg, Pennsylvania
 Ament House (1907–1908), 1204 Hulton Road, Oakmont, Pennsylvania
 Minnetonka Building (1908), retail with apartments on upper floors, 5425-5431 Walnut Street, Shadyside, Pittsburgh
 Hamnett House (1910), 579 Briarcliff Road, Point Breeze, Pittsburgh
 Hamilton Cottages (1910–1914), 5635-5663 Beacon Street, Squirrel Hill, Pittsburgh
 Meado'cots (1912), row houses, Rosedale and Madiera Streets, Homewood, Pittsburgh
 Vilsack Row (1912), row houses, 1659-1693 Jancey Street, Morningside, Pittsburgh
 Highland Towers Apartments (1913), 340-342 South Highland Avenue, Shadyside, Pittsburgh
 Hellmund House (1915), 7510 Trevanion Avenue, Regent Square, Swissvale, Pennsylvania
 Barnes-Ambrose House (1916), 592 Briarcliff Road, Point Breeze, Pittsburgh
 Row houses (1919), 1300 Singer Place, Wilkinsburg, Pennsylvania
 Parkstone Dwellings (1922), double duplex, 6937-6943 Penn Avenue, North Point Breeze, Pittsburgh
 Harter House (1923), 2557 Beechwood Boulevard, Squirrel Hill, Pittsburgh
 Klages House (1923), 5525 Beverly Place, Highland Park, Pittsburgh
 Starr Houses (1927), 1715 and 1717 Denniston St, Squirrel Hill, Pittsburgh
 A Starr House is also famous as being the residence of Billy Conn and his family from the early 1940s through the late 1990s.

References

Further reading

External links
A review of Martin Aurand's book on Scheibler

1872 births
1958 deaths
American people of German descent
19th-century American architects
Architects from Pittsburgh
20th-century American architects
People from Pittsburgh
Architects from Pennsylvania